Nee or NEE may refer to:

Names
 Née (lit. "born"), a woman's family name at birth before the adoption of another surname usually after marriage
The male equivalent "né" is used to indicate what a man was originally known as before the adoption of a different name.
 Nee (surname)
 Ni (surname), also romanized as Nee

Film
 Nee (film), a 1966 Indian Tamil film

Music
 Nee (band), a Kannada band
 "Nee" (Yōko Oginome song), a 1991 song by Yōko Oginome
 "Nee" (Perfume song), a 2010 song by Perfume
 "Nee?" (Aya Matsuura song), a 2003 song by Aya Matsuura

Abbreviations and acronyms
 Net Ecosystem Exchange, a measurement of carbon uptake
 NEE, a political party in Flanders, Belgium
 Ethinylestradiol/norethisterone, an oral contraceptive
 NextEra Energy, a United States company having the stock symbol NEE
 Named-entity extraction in natural language processing
 North East England, region of the UK

See also
 Ni (disambiguation)
 Knee (disambiguation)